The CCCF Youth Championship was an association football (soccer) tournament made for teams in the area of Central America and the Caribbean between the years of 1954 and 1960, under the auspices of the Confederacion Centroamericana y del Caribe de Futbol (CCCF).

The competition was replaced with CONCACAF Youth Championship following the CCCF merger with NAFC to form CONCACAF in 1961.

Tournament results

Source:

Winners

References 

International association football competitions in the Caribbean
International association football competitions in Central America
Defunct international association football competitions in North America
Recurring sporting events established in 1954
Recurring events disestablished in 1960
1954 establishments in North America
1960 disestablishments in North America